Trophithauma is a genus of flies in the family Phoridae.

Species
T. dissitum Schmitz, 1925
T. fulvum Gotô, 1984
T. gastroflavidum Liu, 1995
T. pellucidum Gotô, 1984
T. portentum Schmitz, 1925
T. rostratum (Melander & Brues, 1903)
T. sinuatum Liu & Chou, 1993
T. splendidum Schmitz, 1925

References

Phoridae
Platypezoidea genera
Taxa named by Hermann Schmitz